1–7 Constitution Hill in Birmingham, England is a Grade II listed building at the acute junction with Hampton Street, and is a former H.B. Sale factory.  The red brick and terracotta structure is extremely thin, with a tower at one end.

History 

It was designed in 1895 and 1896 by William Doubleday and James R. Shaw for H. B. Sale, a die-sinker firm that  occupies premises on Summer Lane within 100 metres of the original building. The original plans were for five stories, but only four were built. A fifth storey was added in the mid-20th century before planning laws were in force to protect the integrity of original structures and as a result, the fifth floor is not of the same architectural style of  the 1895 building. The tower is original, built in 1896 as a memorial to Lord Roberts of Kandahar (1832–1914) who led a successful campaign in Afghanistan in 1879 before a career in India. Plans show three independent shops and offices at ground level. There was an engine room and dynamo in the basement.

The present owner also purchased the adjacent buildings numbers 9-11 Constitution Hill in the early 1990s in order to provide better access to the listed main body of the property.

Known locally as the 'Red Palace', the building  was only occupied on the top two floors. The lower floors remained empty after the previous tenant, a Chinese restaurant trading as 'China Village', vacated in approximately 2002. The basement floor was used as the kitchens serving the main restaurant on the ground floor and function room on the first floor. The building fabric has been deteriorating for a number of years and needs a significant investment if the building is to survive long term.

The ground and first floor re-opened as a Syrian/Lebanese restaurant called 'Syriana' in April 2008.

References

Pevsner Architectural Guides – Birmingham, Andy Foster, 2005, 
Birmingham (City Building Series), Douglas Hickman, 1970, Studio Vista Limited
The Birmingham Jewellery Quarter – An Architectural Survey of the Manufactories, John Cattell, Sheila Ely, Barry Jones, English Heritage, 2002,

External links

Grade II listed buildings in Birmingham